Frione is an Italian surname. Notable people with the surname include:

Francisco Frione (1912–1935), Uruguayan-Italian footballer
Ricardo Alberto Frione (1911–1986), Uruguayan footballer

Italian-language surnames